is a Japanese racing driver and drifting driver who currently competes in Super GT and D1 Grand Prix. Taniguchi is commonly nicknamed "NOB" (first three letters from his name, meaning "No One Better") or "The Pimp" as a reference to his S15 Silvia which he is best known for.

Career
Taniguchi began his motorsport career when he was racing minibikes and won a Honda sponsored All Japan Mini Bike race, which took place at its Suzuka Circuit. Taniguchi would progress into four wheels and became interested in drifting when he acquired a Toyota AE86. He moved to Tokyo in 1998 with the aim of becoming a motor journalist. He also worked at Takahiro Ueno's car bodykit company, Car Make T&E to supplement his racing career whilst competing in various one make series racing with the Toyota Celica and Vitz and participating in drift events. In 1999, he came into the attention of HKS when he won a Suzuka Clubman Race in a Honda Civic sponsored by Bride. HKS signed him up as a test driver and as a sponsor, as well as sponsoring his S15 Silvia for drift events.

Drifting
Taniguchi started out in street racing with his AE86 when he was with his team 'After-Fire' and competed in the various drift competitions like Video Option's Ikaten, Battle Magazine's BM-Cup, and CarBoy's DoriCon GP. Taniguchi won the first season of D1 Grand Prix in 2001 for HKS. However starting in 2002, he didn't have much chances with the series champion title as he did in 2001 as the series had banned the use of S-tires/Semi-slicks that was occurring the year before but he was doing very well, staying as a seeded driver.

Mid way through the 2004 season of D1, Taniguchi switched to an Altezza which had not been properly set up and had shown some technical issues that many believe cost him the championship that year. Taniguchi did admit that he wanted to finish the 2004 season with the S15 RS-2 instead, as well as wanting to retire the car with the champion title under its name. During the 2005 season, the switch to Altezza was proving to be a mistake for HKS and NOB which led them to quit the series at the end of the season. Both of them did not return to the D1 series until 2008 as a spot participant. And they fully returned to the series again in 2012 with a Toyota 86. Taniguchi retired from professional drifting competition after D1GP exhibition event in 2016.

Taniguchi has gone through four cars with HKS for D1, between 2001 and 2005, the RS1 Hyper Silvia S15 (Crashed by Keiichi Tsuchiya, eventually rebuilt for 2002 and later revised as a backup car with a similar build to the RS2 in 2003, later bought by Rockstar Energy to be used in Formula D), and RS2 Hyper Silvia S15 (brought to HKS Europe), the Genki Racing Project Altezza, which was designed with off-the-shelf HKS parts, for the purpose that a private drifter could copy the car, HKS also built second Altezza nicknamed IS220Z which originally his car but he lend it to be built by HKS for event. He also drifts in Toyota Aristo (Lexus GS300 in US) for non-D1 events.

HKS and Formula Drift made an exclusive partnership in 2007 that brought NOB to the United States to perform drifting exhibitions at Formula Drift events. Taniguchi made his first appearance at Formula Drift's second event Road Atlanta, May 11 and 12, 2007.

Taniguchi had the most wins in D1 Grand Prix until his tally was overtaken by Youichi Imamura in 2005.

He regurarly appeared in Formula Drift Japan event as Japanese commentator alongside announcer Tom Saeba and sometimes as judge.

Racing
He was also a test driver for HKS in 2004 and 2007 where he drove the HKS Time Attack Mitsubishi Lancer Evolution 7 and set a 54.37 second lap time at Tsukuba Circuit (famous for its complexity and focus on cornering skills), and again in 2007, where he drove the all carbon fiber body HKS CT230R Mitsubishi Evolution and set the Tsukuba Time Attack record of 53.589 seconds (video).

Taniguchi and HKS have not limited their racing campaign to Japan. In 2005, Taniguchi drove the HKS USA Mitsubishi Evolution in the Car and Driver Super Tuner Challenge against top US manufacturers and drivers. Taniguchi beat the nearest competitor by three seconds, and set the day's fastest ¼ mile, 0-60, and road course times. In 2006, Taniguchi drove the HKS Speed Source RX-8 in the Grand Am Cup race at Arizona's Phoenix International Raceway and set the fasted qualifying time for any Mazda RX-8.

Taniguchi won the Super Taikyu series in Japan in 2002 and 2005. In 2002 he began competing in JGTC with RE Amemiya in a Mazda RX-7. He has continued to compete in the series as it became Super GT in 2005. Having previously raced for Team Taisan in 2007/08 he has returned to Amemiya in 2009. After RE Amemiya's withdrawal at the end of 2010 season, he moved to Goodsmile Racing using a BMW Z4 GT3 which also ends his drought of GT300 Champion title in 2011 season. Again with the BMW Z4 GT3, Taniguchi captured 3rd place in the 2014 season finale at Twin Ring Motegi, secured 78 points in total for his season, narrowly winning the GT300 Champion title again with no points difference but only 1 more race victory. In 2017 in second year of using Mercedes-AMG GT3 he wins his third GT300 title again alongside Tatsuya Kataoka and both have the most titles in GT300 categories.

He made his World Touring Car Championship debut with Proteam Motorsport at the 2009 FIA WTCC Race of Japan, at the Okayama International Circuit.

He has won the 2009 Super Taikyu Championship with his team mate Masataka Yanagida and Fariqe Hairuman in Petronas Syntium Team BMW Z4M Coupé. He also won the A5 petrol class and second overall in 2010 Dubai 24 Hour with his team mate Fariqe Hairuman, Masataka Yanagida and Johannes Stuck in Petronas Syntium Team BMW Z4M Coupé.

Other work

Taniguchi appears in many DVD series, such as Video Option, Drift Tengoku, Best Motoring, Rev Speed Video and Hot Version. He now lives in an apartment in Yokohama opposite his friend and former employer Ueno.

Youtube 
On 24 March 2020 he created his own Youtube channel called NOBチャンネル and uploaded his first video on 3 April and has since regularly uploading every Friday, his content including a car review, his project cars and many motorsport related videos.

As of August 2022 he has over 200,000 subscribers.

Complete Drifting Results

D1 Grand Prix

Racing record

Complete JGTC/Super GT results
(key) (Races in bold indicate pole position) (Races in italics indicate fastest lap)

‡ Half points awarded as less than 75% of race distance was completed.
* Season still in progress.

References

External links

 Official Site
 Drift Japan » Nobuteru "NOB" Taniguchi - Driver Profile, History and Overview
 Video featuring Taniguchi's HKS CT230R Mitsubishi Evolution 53.589 second lap record
D1 Supporter profile

Japanese racing drivers
Drifting drivers
1971 births
Living people
D1 Grand Prix drivers
World Touring Car Championship drivers
Super GT drivers
Sportspeople from Hiroshima
Asian Le Mans Series drivers
Mercedes-AMG Motorsport drivers